W. Thomas Spencer (August 6, 1928 – September 30, 2018) was an American politician in the state of Florida.

He served in the Florida State Senate from 1966 - 1968 as a Democratic member for the 45th district. He also in the Florida House of Representatives, from 1966 to 1968.

References

1928 births
2018 deaths
Politicians from Miami
Democratic Party members of the Florida House of Representatives
Democratic Party Florida state senators
Lawyers from Miami
20th-century American lawyers